Goran Marković (born 24 August 1946) is a Serbian film and theatre director, screenwriter, writer, and playwright. He has directed approximately 50 documentaries, 13 feature films, and 3 theatre plays. He has also written five books.

Marković is one of the few directors from the former Yugoslavia credited with popularizing Yugoslav films, as well as achieving success domestically and internationally.

Career
Marković was born in Belgrade to Rade and Olivera Marković, both established Serbian actors.  He finished 5th Belgrade Gymnasium prior to attending FAMU at the Academy of Performing Arts in Prague.

Marković is the winner of more than 30 Yugoslavian, Serbian, and international film and theatre awards, the most significant of them being two Pula festival "Zlatna arena" awards, an award for the best director at the San Sebastian Film Festival for the film Tito and Me, Grand Prix of Americas at the Montreal World Film Festival for the movie Kordon and Sterija's Award for the best modern drama text for the theatre play "Turneja". The film version of Turneja won both "Best Film" and "Best Scenario" at the 2009 European Film Festival in Kyiv as well as Best Director and the Fipresci awards at the Montreal World Film Festival.

A consistent opponent of the government of Slobodan Milošević, Marković expressed his political stance in three post-1995 documentary films produced or co-produced with Radio B92: Crazy People (1997), Ordinary Heroes (2000) and Serbia, Year Zero (2001).

Marković was also a professor at Belgrade Faculty of Dramatic Arts and is a member of the European Film Academy in Brussels.

In 2017, Marković has signed the Declaration on the Common Language of the Croats, Serbs, Bosniaks and Montenegrins.

Filmography

Feature films

Documentaries
 Neobavezno (1970), TV series documentary in two installments
 Glumci (1973), TV series documentary in two installments
 Junaci (1976), TV series documentary in five installments
 Poludeli ljudi (1997)
 Nevažni junaci (1999)
 Serbie, année zéro (2001)
 Konstantin Koča Popović (2014)
 Mnoštvo i manjina (2017)

See also 
 Praška filmska škola

References

External links 
 

1946 births
Living people
Film people from Belgrade
Serbian film directors
Academy of Performing Arts in Prague alumni
Signatories of the Declaration on the Common Language